Abubakar Imam O.B.E C.O.N L.L.D (Hon.) N.N.M.C.  (1911 - 1981) was a Nigerian writer, journalist and politician from Kagara, Niger in Nigeria. For most of his life, he lived in Zaria, where he was the first Hausa editor of Gaskiya Ta Fi Kwabo, the pioneer Hausa-language Newspaper in Northern Nigeria.

Education 
He attended Katsina College and the University of London's Institute of Education. He submitted the play Ruwan Bagaja for a literary competition in 1933.

Work 
In 1939, together with Robert East and a few others, they started the Gaskiya corporation, a publishing house, which became a successful venture and created a platform for many Northern Nigerian intellectuals. The exposure of many premier writers in Northern Nigeria to the political process influenced Imam to join politics. In 1952, with the formation of the Northern People's Congress (NPC), together with Umaru Agaie and Nuhu Bamalli, they formed the major administrative nucleus of the party.

Publication 
Alh Abubakar Imam was also the author of Magana Jari Ce with the help of some collections provided by East, author of Ruwan Bagaja and Tafiya mabudin ilmi, a book He wrote on his experiences after a visit to London.
He was also the author of Tarihin Annabi Kammalalle, a biography of Muhammad.

See also 

 Magana Jari Ce
 Ruwan Bagaja
 Northern Nigerian Publishing Company Limited
 Gaskiya Ta Fi Kwabo
 Muhammadu Bello Kagara

Bibliography

References

Further reading 

1911 births
1981 deaths
Alumni of the UCL Institute of Education
Nigerian writers
Northern People's Congress politicians
People from Zaria
20th-century Nigerian writers
20th-century Nigerian politicians
Hausa-language writers
People from Niger State